Speightiidae is an extinct taxonomic family of fossil sea snails, marine gastropod mollusks.
This family is not assigned to a superfamily. It has been traditionally classified near the family Turridae. But in 1993 it was shown that many, if not all, species that were placed in this family should instead be placed in the family Fasciolariidae.

There are currently only two accepted genuses within the family, Andicula and Speightia. Both of these are monotypic, including a single species each: Andicula occidentalis  and Speightia spinosa .

References

Prehistoric gastropods
Taxa named by Arthur William Baden Powell